Aeroprakt Ltd. (Аэропракт) is a Ukrainian aircraft manufacturer based in Kyiv and founded in 1991 by Yuri Yakovlev. The company specializes in the design and manufacture of light aircraft, homebuilt aircraft and ultralights in the form of kits for amateur construction and ready-to-fly aircraft.

The company is a "Товариство з обмеженою відповідальністю" a form of limited liability company. It has about 50 employees and operates from a  facility.

History

The company was founded as an amateur aircraft design club by Yuri Yakovlev when he graduated from the Kuybyshev Aviation Institute and commenced work at Antonov in Kyiv in 1986. It was at the time of Ukrainian independence from the Soviet Union in 1991 that the company was formally formed.

The company was named after a similar-named club in Kuybyshev, Russia, founded while Yakovlev was there at school.

The company's first aircraft was the Aeroprakt T-8, a simple two-seat ultralight trainer. The prototype was constructed in 1987 and first shown in the Soviet Union in 1989, but did not enter series production, despite winning awards.

The first true production aircraft was the Aeroprakt A-20 Vista known locally as the Chervonets, the first prototype of which was finished in August 1991. As a result of the design and the political situation at the time, the club became the  Kyiv division of Lada-Mononor, a joint Soviet-Finnish venture that was headquartered in Tolyatti, Russia. Yuri Yakovlev was named the Chief Designer and Oleg Litovchenko became its director. After the collapse of the Soviet Union in 1991 the company became an independent entity and the A-20 entered production, with the first production aircraft delivered in July, 1993.

November 1996 saw the introduction of the  A-22 Foxbat, known locally as the Sharik and the twin-engined A-26 Vulcan as well.

The company has continued to develop new aircraft based on the A-20 concept, including the A-28 Victor and the A-36 Vulcan. In 2014 the A-32 Vixxen, a development of the A-22, was introduced.

Aircraft 
Summary of aircraft built by Aeroprakt:

 Aeroprakt T-8
 Aeroprakt A-6 White
 Aeroprakt A-11M Hamlet
 Aeroprakt A-15
 Aeroprakt A-19
 Aeroprakt A-20
 Aeroprakt A-21 Solo
 Aeroprakt A-22 Foxbat
 Aeroprakt A-23 Dragon
 Aeroprakt A-24 Viking
 Aeroprakt A-25 Breeze
 Aeroprakt A-26 Vulcan
 Aeroprakt A-27
 Aeroprakt A-28 Victor
 Aeroprakt A-30 Vista Speedster
 Aeroprakt A-32 Vixxen
 Aeroprakt A-33 Dragon
 Aeroprakt A-36 Super Vulcan

References

External links

Aircraft manufacturers of Ukraine
Manufacturing companies based in Kyiv
Ultralight aircraft
Homebuilt aircraft